Indigenous people in Venezuela, Amerindians or Native Venezuelans, form about 2% of the total population of Venezuela, although many Venezuelans are mixed with indigenous ancestry. Indigenous people are concentrated in the Southern Amazon rainforest state of Amazonas, where they make up nearly 50% of the population and in the Andes of the western state of Zulia. The most numerous indigenous people, at about 200,000, is the Venezuelan part of the Wayuu (or Guajiro) people who primarily live in Zulia between Lake Maracaibo and the Colombian border. Another 100,000 or so indigenous people live in the sparsely populated southeastern states of Amazonas, Bolívar and Delta Amacuro. 

There are at least 30 indigenous groups in Venezuela, including the Wayuu (413,000), Warao people (36,000), Ya̧nomamö (35,000), Kali'na (34,000), Pemon (30,000), Anu͂ (21,000), Huottüja (15,000), Motilone Barí, Ye'kuana and Yaruro.

History

It is not known how many people lived in Venezuela before the Spanish Conquest; it may have been around a million people and in addition to today's peoples included groups such as the Auaké, Caquetio, Mariche, Pemon, Piaroa and Timoto-cuicas. The number was much reduced after the Conquest, mainly through the spread of new diseases from Europe. There were two main north-south axes of pre-Columbian population, producing maize in the west and manioc in the east. Large parts of the Llanos plains were cultivated through a combination of slash and burn and permanent settled agriculture. The indigenous peoples of Venezuela had already encountered crude oils and asphalts that seeped up through the ground to the surface. Known to the locals as mene, the thick, black liquid was primarily used for medicinal purposes, as an illumination source and for the caulking of canoes.

Spain's colonization of mainland Venezuela started in 1522, establishing its first permanent South American settlement in the  city of Cumaná. The name "Venezuela" is said to derive from palafito villages on Lake Maracaibo reminding Amerigo Vespucci of Venice (hence "Venezuela" or "little Venice"). Indian caciques (leaders) such as Guaicaipuro (circa 1530–1568) and Tamanaco (died 1573) attempted to resist Spanish incursions, but the newcomers ultimately subdued them. Historians agree that the founder of Caracas, Diego de Losada, ultimately put Tamanaco to death. Some of the resisting tribes or the leaders are commemorated in place names, including Caracas, Chacao and Los Teques. The early colonial settlements focussed on the northern coast, but in the mid-eighteenth century the Spanish pushed further inland along the Orinoco River. Here the Ye'kuana (then known as the Makiritare) organised serious resistance in 1775 and 1776. Under Spanish colonization, several religious orders established mission stations. The Jesuits withdrew in the 1760s, while the Capuchins found their missions of strategic significance in the War of Independence and in 1817 were brutally taken over by the forces of Simon Bolivar. For the remainder of the nineteenth century governments did little for indigenous peoples and they were pushed away from the country's agricultural centre to the periphery.

In 1913, during a rubber boom, Colonel Tomas Funes seized control of Amazonas's San Fernando de Atabapo, killing over 100 settlers. In the following nine years in which Funes controlled the town, Funes destroyed dozens of Ye'kuana villages and killed several thousand Ye'kuana.

In October 1999, Pemon destroyed a number of electricity pylons constructed to carry electricity from the Guri Dam to Brazil. The Pemon argued that cheap electricity would encourage further development by mining companies. The $110 million project was completed in 2001.

Political organization
The National Council of Venezuelan Indians (Consejo Nacional Indio de Venezuela, CONIVE) was formed in 1989 and represents the majority of indigenous peoples, with 60 affiliates representing 30 peoples. In September 1999, indigenous peoples "marched on the National Congress in Caracas to pressure the Constitutional Assembly for the inclusion of important pro-[indigenous] provisions in the new constitution, such as the right to ownership, free transit across international borders, free choice of nationality, and land demarcation within two years."

Legal rights
Prior to the creation of the 1999 constitution of Venezuela, legal rights for indigenous peoples were increasingly lagging behind other Latin American countries, which were progressively enshrining a common set of indigenous collective rights in their national constitutions. The 1961 constitution had actually been a step backward from the 1947 constitution, and the indigenous rights law foreseen in it languished for a decade, unpassed by 1999.

Ultimately the 1999 constitutional process produced "the region's most progressive indigenous rights regime". Innovations included Article 125's guarantee of political representation at all levels of government and Article 124's prohibition on "the registration of patents related to indigenous genetic resources or intellectual property associated with indigenous knowledge." The new constitution followed the example of Colombia in reserving parliamentary seats for indigenous delegates (three in Venezuela's National Assembly) and it was the first Latin American constitution to reserve indigenous seats in state assemblies and municipal councils in districts with indigenous populations.

Languages
The main language families are
 Arawakan languages
 Carib languages
 Chibchan languages

See also

Panare people

References

External links
 Ethnic Map of Venezuela by census 
 

 
Venezuela
Ethnic groups in Venezuela